Orient Park is an unincorporated community in Hillsborough County, Florida,  United States.  Along with East Lake, it is a part of the census-designated place (CDP) of East Lake-Orient Park. The ZIP code for the community is 33619.

Geography
Orient Park is located at 28 degrees north, 82.3 degrees west (27.973, -82.373); or approximately five miles northeast of Tampa. The elevation of the community is 33 feet above sea level.

Orient Park boundaries include Uceta Yard to the south, Tampa Bypass Canal to the east, East Lake to the north, and Grant Park and Florence Villa to the west.

Major surface roads in Orient Park
Some of the major surface roads serving the community include:
Orient Road
U.S. Highway 301
Broadway
Columbus Drive

Education
The community of Orient Park is served by Hillsborough County Schools.

References

External links
Orient Park profile from Hometown Locator
Orient Park FL Map: I-75tampa.com

Unincorporated communities in Hillsborough County, Florida
Unincorporated communities in Florida